The Oath is a 1921 American silent drama film directed by Raoul Walsh and starring Miriam Cooper, Robert Fischer and Conway Tearle. The film's sets were designed by the art director William Cameron Menzies. It is based on the 1911 novel Idols by the British writer William John Locke.

Cast
 Miriam Cooper as Minna Hart
 Robert Fischer as Israel Hart
 Conway Tearle as Hugh Coleman
 Henry Clive as Gerard Merriam
 Ricca Allen as Anna Cassaba
 Anna Q. Nilsson as Irene Lansing

References

Bibliography
 Munden, Kenneth White. The American Film Institute Catalog of Motion Pictures Produced in the United States, Part 1. University of California Press, 1997.

External links
 

1921 films
1921 drama films
1920s English-language films
American silent feature films
Silent American drama films
American black-and-white films
Films directed by Raoul Walsh
First National Pictures films
Films based on British novels
1920s American films